Quistgaard is a Danish surname. Notable people with the surname include:

 Georg Quistgaard (1915–1944), member of the Danish resistance movement
 Jens Quistgaard (1919–2008), Danish sculptor and designer
 Erik Quistgaard (1921-2013), Director-General of ESA
 Jacob Quistgaard, Danish guitarist